Michael Joseph Hayes (1 December 1889 – 11 July 1976) was an Irish Fine Gael politician who served as Ceann Comhairle of Dáil Éireann from 1922 to 1932, Minister for Foreign Affairs from August 1922 to September 1922 and Minister for Education January 1922 to August 1922. He served as a Teachta Dála (TD) for the National University constituency from 1921 to 1933. He was a Senator from 1938 to 1965.

Hayes was born in Dublin in 1889. He was educated at the Synge Street CBS and at University College Dublin (UCD). He later became a lecturer in French at the university. In 1913, he joined the Irish Volunteers and fought in Jacob's Factory during the Easter Rising in 1916. He escaped capture but was arrested in 1920 and interned at Ballykinlar, County Down.

He was first elected to Dáil Éireann as a Sinn Féin TD for the National University constituency at the 1921 general election. At the 1922 general election he was elected as a Pro-Treaty Sinn Féin TD. He supported the Anglo-Irish Treaty during the crucial debates in 1922. He served as Minister for Education from January to September 1922, as part of the Dáil Ministry (as opposed to the Provisional Government). He had special responsibility for secondary education. He was also acting Minister for Foreign Affairs from August to September 1922. That same year he was elected Ceann Comhairle of the Dáil Éireann. He held that post for ten years until 1932.

At the 1923 general election, he was elected as a Cumann na nGaedheal TD for two constituencies; Dublin South and the National University. He resigned his seat in Dublin South following the election.

Hayes lost his Dáil seat at the 1933 general election, but was elected to Seanad Éireann in 1938 for Fine Gael. He remained a Senator until 1965, acting as leader of government and opposition there.

Hayes became Professor of Irish at University College Dublin in 1951.

References

External links

 

 

1889 births
1976 deaths
Cumann na nGaedheal TDs
Fine Gael senators
Early Sinn Féin TDs
Members of the 2nd Dáil
Members of the 3rd Dáil
Members of the 4th Dáil
Members of the 5th Dáil
Members of the 6th Dáil
Members of the 7th Dáil
Members of the 2nd Seanad
Members of the 3rd Seanad
Members of the 4th Seanad
Members of the 5th Seanad
Members of the 6th Seanad
Members of the 7th Seanad
Members of the 8th Seanad
Members of the 9th Seanad
Members of the 10th Seanad
Ministers for Education (Ireland)
Ministers for Foreign Affairs (Ireland)
Politicians from County Dublin
Presiding officers of Dáil Éireann
Alumni of University College Dublin
Teachtaí Dála for the National University of Ireland
Nominated members of Seanad Éireann
People educated at Synge Street CBS